Bob Bryan and Mike Bryan were the defending champions, but they lost to Mardy Fish and Andy Roddick in the quarterfinals.

Roddick eventually withdrew from the final because of a shoulder injury and American couple John Isner and Sam Querrey won the title.

Seeds
All seeds receive a bye into the second round.

Draw

Finals

Top half

Bottom half

References
 Doubles Draw

Italian Open - Doubles
Men's Doubles